The Irish White Cross was established on 1 February 1921 as a mechanism for distributing funds raised by the American Committee for Relief in Ireland. It was managed by the Quaker businessman, and later Irish Free State senator,  James G. Douglas. The White Cross continued to operate until the Irish Civil War and its books were officially closed in 1928. From 1922 its activities were essentially wound down and remaining funds divested to subsidiary organisations. The longest running of these aid committees was the Children's Relief Association which distributed aid to child victims of this troubled period, north and south of the border, until 1947.

Bibliography
Douglas, James G. Ed. J. Anthony Gaughan: Memoirs of Senator James G. Douglas- Concerned Citizen:University College Dublin Press: 1998: 
Report of American Committee for Relief in Ireland:  Internet Archive
Report of the Irish White Cross to 31 August, 1922 : Internet Archive
Elizabeth, Helen : The Largest Amount of Good: Quaker Relief in Ireland, 1654–1921 : 1993 : 
Ceannt, Áinne B.É : Irish White Cross 1920–47 – The Storey of its Work : Pub. 'At the Sign of the Three Candles' : Dublin : 1947? National Library of Ireland Call No. Ir 361c2

References

External links
 The Irish White Cross and the Black and Tans Kildare Nationalist – September 2007
I.W.C. Fund-raising Stamps University of Notre Dame collection
 Report of the Irish White Cross from 31 August 1922, Prepared by W.J. Williams Adams Auction Rooms
  Memorandum from Harry Boland (New York), 5 August 1921 to Eamon de Valera (Dublin) re. White CrossDocuments on Irish Foreign Policy

Irish War of Independence
Medical and health organisations based in the Republic of Ireland
1921 establishments in Ireland
1928 disestablishments in Ireland
Quaker organisations based Ireland